Shaun Scott (born November 8, 1984) is an American filmmaker, film director, film editor, writer, historian, activist, and former candidate for Seattle City Council.

Film career 

Scott is a Seattle-based independent filmmaker whose first feature film was "Seat of Empire" (2009), a 3-hour long documentary tour of the city of Seattle using archival footage. In 2010 he directed and wrote "Waste of Time", a historical mash-up of original footage, archival images, and contemporary music meant as a portrait of consumer capitalism.

Scott's first narrative feature was "100% OFF: A Recession-Era Romance" (2012), a docudrama about a kleptomaniac and the immigrant wife with whom he enters a marriage of convenience. It was followed in 2014 by "Pacific Aggression", a straightforward narrative about a social media addict and the blogger she stalks. In 2014, Scott announced plans to direct the (as yet uncompleted) feature film "Their Eyes Were Watching The Light," a period piece about a hostage situation set in 1932.

Writing career 

Scott began a career as a writer in late 2014, contributing pieces about American politics and race relations to The Monarch Review and The Seattle Weekly. In July 2015, Scott was hired by City Arts Magazine as a columnist, where he runs an ongoing thread called "Faded Signs" about popular culture under late capitalism.

In September 2015, Thought Catalog Books published Scott's short-form essay "Something Better: Millennials and Late Capitalism at the Movies" on iTunes and Amazon. In 2018, Zero Books published Scott's book-length history of the Millennial generation titled "Millennials and the Moments that Made Us: A Cultural History of the U.S. from 1982-present."

Political career

Scott was a field organizer for US Representative Pramila Jayapal. Scott helped unionize Jayapal's 2018 campaign staff through the Campaign Worker's Guild.

In November 2018, Scott announced his bid for Seattle City Council District 4 to replace interim council member Abel Pacheco. Scott received endorsements from alternative weekly The Stranger and local chapters of the Sierra Club and Our Revolution. He received enough votes in the 2019 Washington primary election to advance to the general election in November 2019, but lost the race to Alex Pedersen.

In 2020, Scott served as the Washington State Field Director for Presidential Candidate Bernie Sanders.

Scott is a member of the 43rd LD Democrats and the Seattle chapter of the Democratic Socialists of America.

Political Positions

Housing

Scott advocates a housing policy geared toward decommodification of housing to combat soaring rents and homelessness. He proposes investing in public housing and implementing policies that discourage real estate speculation.

Green New Deal

Scott has publicly called for a municipal Green New Deal for the city of Seattle. This is set of policy proposals meant to reduce Seattle's carbon footprint by increasing urban density and investing in mass transit in order to reduce dependency on private cars.

Labor

Scott is a supporter of labor unions. In addition, he has proposed a "Freelancer's Bill of Rights" to ensure worker protections for gig economy workers, including mandatory contracts for work over 30 days, an end to non-compete clauses, and a portable benefits program.

Municipal Broadband

Scott supports the creation of a Seattle municipal broadband public utility, similar to what exists in Chattanooga, TN.

Public Health

Scott supports a harm reduction strategy to combat drug addiction, including the establishment of safe injection sites. He has criticized sweeps of homeless encampments as both ineffective and unjust.

Filmography
Feature Films (as Director/Writer)
 Seat of Empire (2009)
 Waste of Time (2010)
 100% OFF: A Recession-Era Romance (2012)
 Pacific Aggression (2014)

Short Films/Music Videos
 Shaun's Daydream (2008)
 Steppin' Into Tomorrow (2009)
 Driven (2013)
 An American Day (2014)
 Home Of The Mighty (2014)

Bibliography
Something Better: Millennials and Late Capitalism at the Movies (2015)
Millennials and the Moments That Made Us: A Cultural History of the U.S. from 1982-Present (2018)

References

Sources

http://www.thestranger.com/seattle/scotts-empire/Content?oid=3538008

http://dailyuw.com/archive/2010/05/20/imported/artist-spotlight-shaun-scott#.U9LGdlaE7Bg
http://www.thestranger.com/seattle/art-house/Content?oid=5623834

1984 births
American film directors
Living people
American film editors
Washington (state) Democrats
African-American people in Washington (state) politics
Members of the Democratic Socialists of America
21st-century African-American people
20th-century African-American people